MV Kota Wajar is a 1997-built container ship operated by Pacific International Lines. On 15 October 2009, she was captured by Somali pirates en route to Mombasa.  After received a $4 million ransom, the pirates released the ship on 28 December 2009, she was then assisted with medical supplies and logistics by the Canadian frigate HMCS Fredericton (FFH 337).

References

Ships of Singapore
Pakistan–Somalia relations
Piracy in Somalia
Maritime incidents in 2009
1997 ships